Ieva Nagy (born 22 January 1991) is an Australian professional basketball player who plays for the Adelaide Lightning in the WNBL.

Career

College
Nagy began her college career at Troy University in Troy, Alabama. After two years, she earned herself a transfer to Hawaii Pacific University in Honolulu, Hawaii for the Hawaii Pacific Sharks in NCAA Division II.

WNBL
Growing up in Adelaide, Nagy would begin her WNBL career in her home town, with the Adelaide Lightning for the 2015–16 WNBL season. Nagy has been re-signed for the 2016–17 season.

References

1991 births
Australian women's basketball players
Australian people of Hungarian descent
Adelaide Lightning players
Living people
Forwards (basketball)
Guards (basketball)